Habib University (HU) is a private liberal arts university located in Karachi, Pakistan.

Funded by the House of Habib, the Habib University Foundation was established in 2010, and was chartered in 2012 as an independent university. Based on a 6.3 acres (295,800 sq ft.) campus in Gulistan-e-Jauhar, Karachi, it is a multi-disciplinary university offering undergraduate degree's in science, engineering, arts, humanities and social sciences. It has a strong liberal arts focus and requires all its students to take a set of liberal arts courses consisting of sociology, history, philosophy and anthropology.

History 
In 2010, the House of Habib formed the Habib University Foundation (a not-for-profit organization). The project was launched with a grant of US$40 million. Construction on the campus in Gulistan-e-Jauhar, Karachi began in 2012 and classes began in 2014.

The university has a joint venture contract with Texas A&M University at Qatar for reciprocal sharing of institutional experience and has signed a partnership agreement for the association.

HU's first class of undergraduate students began in August 2014. HU Talent Outreach Program (TOPS), launched in 2016, provides selected students a tuition fee waiver for four-year undergraduate program. Wasif Rizvi is the founding President of the University. The university's chief academic officer is Dr. Aamir Hasan who serves as Vice President for Academic Affairs (VPAA) and Dean of Faculty.

Campus 

The university's campus is located behind the Jinnah International Airport runway and covers an area of around 6.3 Acres (295,800 sq ft.). The campus is noted for being one of the few handicapped-accessible campuses in the city and is a  non-residential campus. The university's laboratories are designed and furnished by Research Facilities Design.  In 2010 the  campus design won the Merit Award for Excellence in Planning for New Campus from the Society for College and University Planning (SCUP).

The university's central auditorium covers 25,000 square feet of area, and seats over 300 persons. In addition, the university holds two lecture halls, the Tariq Rafi Lecture Theatre which holds 300 students and the Soorty Lecture Theatre which holds 60 seats. The campus includes several classrooms with not more than 20 seats each. The university also includes an amphitheatre which covers an area of 4500 square feet. The Habib library covers an area of 21,000 square feet and is a semi-public space and is home to information commons, lounges, and discussion rooms.

Academics 

The university incorporates a liberal arts education with cultural sensitivity within its curriculum. It is mandatory for every student studying there to follow the liberal arts curriculum in all its offered courses. In addition to local regional languages, all students are required to study a liberal arts curriculum comprising sociology, history, philosophy – Western, Eastern and Islamic – and anthropology. The university terms this a "Habib Core Curriculum" based on seven "Forms of Thought". These include:
 Historical and Social Thought 
 Philosophical Thought 
 Language and Expression 
 Creative Practice 
 Formal Reasoning 
 Quantitative Reasoning 
 Natural Scientific Method and Analysis
The university offers six majors including Computer Science, Computer Engineering, Electrical Engineering, Social Development & Policy, Communication & Design and Comparative Humanities. All classes are modeled after a tutorial system which includes small classes of 12 students.

The university has affiliations with Stanford University, Pitzer College, University of Michigan, University of California, Berkeley, and Texas A&M University; allowing student's to attend summer sessions at these universities. It has a student to teacher ratio of 12:1, and, as of 2016, has 1,000 full-time students.  The university is regarded as among Pakistan's most progressive education institute.

Yohsin Lecture Series 
Yohsin Lecture Series is a public lecture series modeled after the public lecture series of the London School of Economics. The Inaugural Yohsin Lecture was delivered by Dr. Munir Fasheh in November 2011. Other prominent speakers have included: the former Dean for SAIS at the Johns Hopkins University, Dr. Vali Nasr, MIT Professor Deborah K. Fitzgerald, Gayatri Chakravorty Spivak, Reza Aslan and Noam Chomsky.

Dhanani School of Science and Engineering (DSSE) Public Lecture Series 
The Dhanani School of Science and Engineering (DSSE) invites professionals of academia to share their ideas on a wide variety of subjects through its Public Lecture Series.

Interdisciplinary Development Research and Action Center (IDRAC) 
The IDRAC Center at HU fosters research and action on key development challenges facing Pakistan and the larger South Asian region. The Center hosts a series of activities in the region while serving society and contributing to the social welfare.

Center for Media and Design (CMD) 
The Center for Media and Design acts as a hub for talks, symposia, exhibitions, literary readings, and arts such as film, video, music, dance, theater and performance.

Arzu Center 
The Center is named after the 18th century poet, linguist and lexicographer, Siraj-ud-Din Ali Khan Arzu. The Arzu Center is linked to HU's School of Arts, Humanities and Social Sciences programs and serve to meet the vernacular requirements of the University. The Center's scope of work covers a wide range including language instruction, translation from and into the regional languages.

People 
Notable people associated with the university include:
 Haziqul Khairi, an eminent jurist who served as Chief Justice of the Federal Shariat Court, Member Board of Governors.
 Asif Farrukhi (1959-2020), Associate Professor.

See also
List of universities in Pakistan
Gulistan-e-Jauhar
House of Habib
Sindh Baloch Society

References

Further reading 
 For Wasif, Education Is Misunderstood In Pakistan

Private universities and colleges in Sindh
Universities and colleges in Karachi
Engineering universities and colleges in Pakistan
Educational institutions established in 2014
2014 establishments in Pakistan
House of Habib